Pyrmont is an unincorporated community in Clay Township, Carroll County, Indiana.

History
Pyrmont was likely named after Waldeck and Pyrmont, in Germany.

An historical marker, erected in 1977 by the Carroll County Historical Society at the principal intersection in Pyrmont gives some of its history:

John Wagner built a dam, race and saw mill about a mile South in 1833 and added a grist mill. He sold to John Fisher who sold to John Fetterhoff who built a large frame mill. Joel Wagoner, James Allen, Elias Morkert, J. J. Cripe, Wm. Gardner, Bert Smoker were later operators. It burned December 7, 1929. Fetterhoff’s Mill Post Office established 1851, was changed to Pyrmont in 1866.

Pyrmont was the site of a  single span Smith truss covered bridge, built in 1860 by the Wheelock Bridge Company. The bridge collapsed in July, 1951.

Geography

References

External links

Unincorporated communities in Carroll County, Indiana
Unincorporated communities in Indiana
1866 establishments in Indiana
1851 establishments in Indiana
Populated places established in 1866
Populated places established in 1851